The Brown County Democrat is a weekly newspaper based in Nashville, Indiana, United States of America. It is distributed throughout Jackson, Hamblen, Washington, Johnson, and Van Buren townships and covers local, state, and national news. It is a five-time recipient of the “Blue Ribbon Newspaper” award given by The Hoosier State Press Association for non-daily newspapers (1972, 1984, 2007, 2010, 2013). Most recently, the staff at the Brown County Democrat have been awarded The Hoosier State Press Association's 2018 "Story of the Year" award for their story on #DoSomething.

Founded by the George W. Allison family in 1870 under the name “The Jacksonian”, the Allison family changed its name to “The Brown County Democrat” in 1883. It was then sold to the families of the Waltmans and the Bonds who maintained ownership until it was purchased by Bruce “Greg” Temple in 1970. In 2002, Home News Enterprises LLC of Columbus purchased the newspaper and held ownership until 2015 when they sold the Brown County Democrat to its current owner AIM Media Indiana LLC. AIM Media Indiana LLC is managed by AIM Media Management of Dallas, a privately owned company, where Jeremy L. Halbreich serves as Chief Executive Office and owner. The Brown County Democrat has a location sales volume of $396,000 and a paid circulation of 2,731.

References 

Newspapers published in Indiana
Brown County, Indiana